Bangladesh Public Administration Training Centre (BPATC) is a training institute for the public sector. It was founded in 1984, and is situated in Savar, Dhaka District. It has teaching facilities, quarters for the officers, a big mosque and a lake. It is adjacent to the Savar urban area and not very far from the Savar market.

History
Bangladesh Public Administration Training Centre was established on 1984.
The Government of Bangladesh has been showing keen interest in the development of potential of the officials at all levels. Government's concern for more intensified and integrated training for the public servants is reflected in the setting up of the Bangladesh Public Administration Training Centre (BPATC), Savar, Dhaka by merging former Bangladesh Administrative Staff College (BASC), National Institute of Public Administration (NIPA), Civil Officers' Training Academy (COTA) and the Staff Training Institute (STI). Foundation stone of the centre was laid in December 1981 and the centre began functioning from April 28, 1984, as an autonomous body with a Rector as its Head who is a senior Secretary to the Government.
The Centre consists of 6 divisions viz. (i) Programs and Studies, (ii) Management and Public Administration, (iii) Development and Economics, (iv) Research and Consultancy, (v) Development Projects and (vi) Management & Development. Each division is headed by a Member, Directing Staff, who is an officer with the status of a Joint Secretary and Additional Secretary to the Government. Each division consists of a number of departments, which are headed by Directors holding the rank of Deputy Secretary to the Government. Under them there are deputy directors, senior research officers, research officers, assistant directors and evaluation officers.

Administration
The rector (normally the rank of a Senior Secretary) is the head of the training institution, assisted by the MDS (rank of Senior Joint Secretary/Additional Secretary). The rector also chairs the governing body of the BPATC School and College, a secondary school located within the precincts of BPATC.

The apex management of BPATC is under the direction of a high powered governing body headed by a Cabinet Minister.

References

Further reading

External links
 

Government agencies of Bangladesh
Organisations based in Savar
1984 establishments in Bangladesh
Educational organisations based in Bangladesh
Education in Savar
Public administration schools